"Goodbye, My Lady Love" is a 1900 hit popular song written and sung by Joe Howard.

References

Songs about parting
1900 songs
Songs written by Joseph E. Howard